The women's 200 + 400 + 600 + 800 metres medley relay event at the 1970 European Athletics Indoor Championships was held on 15 March in Vienna. The first athlete ran one lap of the 200-metre track, the second two, the third three and the anchor four, thus 10 laps or 2000 metres in total.

Results

References

4 × 400 metres relay at the European Athletics Indoor Championships
Relay